A keep case or poly-box is a type of packaging, most commonly used with DVDs and Blu-ray videos (and sometimes CDs).

Besides DVD-Video films, keep cases are very common with most disc-based video games since the PlayStation 2, and they are also found on many PC titles and MP3-CD audiobooks (all use discs that are the same basic dimensions as a DVD).

Products using keep cases
The first products to be released in keep cases were VHS tapes, though most were stored in less expensive pressboard sleeves. In the days before video games were released on optical media, cartridges would rarely come packaged in specially designed plastic keep cases with lugs inside to hold the instruction manual, as opposed to pressboard boxes. Cartridges and cards for the Sega Master System platform were the first video games to be packaged in any kind of keep case. The vast majority of Sega Genesis/Mega Drive games would come in a plastic keep case (roughly the size of a VHS case), but they were later packaged in pressboard boxes as a cost-cutting measure. Before the standard and commonly used DVD case was invented, early CD-ROM-based video games such as Sega CD and early PlayStation titles would often come in a thicker and taller jewel case. These have been reputed to break very easily. Since the PlayStation 2, most major console-based video game software is packaged in some sort of keep case, including Nintendo DS cartridge titles and Sony PSP titles.

Structure

Materials and features

The cases are made of soft, clear or colored, polypropylene plastic with a transparent polyethylene outer jacket, usually with a printed paper sleeve behind it. A variety of colors are produced, including black, white, red and clear. On the inside are sets of clips that may hold a booklet or additional sheets of paper with extra information. The DVD is held into place with a small protrusion (a "hub") which fits into the hole in the DVD. For console games like the PlayStation 2 and Nintendo GameCube, an extra protrusion is available for storing memory cards.

Types of hubs
The structural differences between a CD and a DVD have led many manufacturers to study different hub designs for keeping the DVD (or the DVDs, in multi-disc cases) in place: unlike CDs, which are made from one layer of plastic material, DVDs have two layers, which are thinner (so that together they reach the same thickness of a CD) and not bonded all the way to the center. As a result, a DVD hub is weaker than a CD's, and may be damaged if stored in a case which is designed for CDs only.

In addition to "pluck hubs" (which are often a simple evolution over the classical "crown of teeth"), "push-to-release" hubs are very common: in this case the hub is made in such a way that simply pushing on it with a finger compresses its component parts, thus shrinking the space it occupies and releasing the disc center; under normal situations the release cannot occur accidentally and requires someone to push on the hub (this is obviously more difficult to obtain in slim and ultra-slim cases, where in fact pluck hubs may be preferred to push-type ones).

Damage risk

The larger size of the keep case compared to the CD jewel box means that if the disc becomes detached from the center hub, it can move around inside the box, and the playable surface can be scratched by the hub. This can be a problem during shipping.

The center "Pluck-Hubs" are designed to keep a disc in place while shipping, but can be too tight for normal home use. Because of this, the disc can be damaged upon removal due to excess warping. However, the edges of the center hub can be permanently bent in slightly to allow for a looser fit. Discs are then able to slip out easily, ideal for the home shelf.

Physical dimensions

Case
The height and width of a (closed) keep case are fixed at 190mm (7.48 inches) and 135mm (5.315 inches), respectively.
The thickness may vary to accommodate more discs ("multi" case) or to require less shelf space ("slim" or "thin" case). For a typical single-disc case it is 15mm.

A keep case, thus, approximates the Video Software Dealers Association recommendation that a single-disc DVD-Video package have the same height as a VHS tape (187 mm) and the same width as a CD jewel case (142 mm). These dimensions are similar to digest size magazines.

Paper sleeve

The printed paper sleeve for a standard DVD case can be printed on a standard A4 sheet of paper which, after cropping, can be slipped into the outer jacket. The paper room on the front and back panels of the case is 129.5mm × 183mm and spine panels have a width of 14mm or less. This gives 273mm × 183mm as resulting maximum overall dimensions for the printout (which is less than the 297mm × 210mm of an A4 paper sheet).

Inserts
Booklet inserts or leaflet material, when folded closed, should measure to a maximum of 120mm × 180mm. This usually includes a digital copy code for a digital locker service or a downloadable content code, if included.

Similar, though not identical, packaging is used for commercial Blu-ray Disc titles and was used for HD DVD titles. However, the dimensions of the cases are somewhat different, about 19 mm shorter. The individual cases are color-coded, with blue being used for Blu-ray and red for HD DVD, and the format displayed prominently on a stripe above the cover art.

Empty cases and do-it-yourself
In addition to the industrial usages reported above, empty keep cases are available at retail stores, which can serve for instance as a replacement for broken cases or for DVDs containing personal video recordings or data. Common brands are Maxell, Memorex, TDK, Verbatim, NexPak, US Digital Media and Amaray. Some vendors, e.g. TDK and Infiniti, also sell recordable DVDs individually packed in keep cases.

See also
 Optical disc packaging

References

DVD
Packaging
Compact disc